Bandon High School is the only public high school in Bandon, Oregon, United States.

Academics
In 2008, 84% of the school's seniors received a high school diploma. Of 58 students, 49 graduated, two dropped out, one received a modified diploma, and six were still in high school the following year.

The class of 2011 was awarded "Most Spirited Class" of Bandon High School by the previous principal, Gaye Knapp.

References

High schools in Coos County, Oregon
Public high schools in Oregon